Christ Church was a historic Episcopal church located at Norfolk, Virginia. It was built in 1828, and was a one-story, temple form church in the Greek Revival style.  It was fronted by a distyle portico with two unfluted Greek Doric order columns.  It measured approximately 64 feet by 96 feet, and featured a cupola with octagonal belfry. The congregations roots can be traced back to 1637. In 1798, the congregation of Borough Church split into two factions, with the other being Saint Paul's Episcopal Church.  Christ Church merged their congregation with St. Luke's in 1910, and the building housed a Greek Orthodox congregation until 1955. It was demolished in January 1973.

It was listed on the National Register of Historic Places in 1971 and delisted in 1973.

References

External links
Parish website

Former National Register of Historic Places in Virginia
Episcopal churches in Virginia
19th-century Episcopal church buildings
Churches on the National Register of Historic Places in Virginia
Greek Revival church buildings in Virginia
Churches completed in 1828
Churches in Norfolk, Virginia
National Register of Historic Places in Norfolk, Virginia
Demolished buildings and structures in Virginia
Buildings and structures demolished in 1973